Łukasz Żegleń (born 9 June 1995 in Opole) is a Polish footballer who plays as a striker.

Career 

Żegleń made his debut in the Polish Ekstraklasa at 27 July 2013 in a 1-2 home defeat against Górnik Zabrze. He entered the field at half-time as substitute for Kamil Kurowski. He scored in the 70th minute.

References

External links 
 

1995 births
Living people
Polish footballers
Poland youth international footballers
Association football forwards
Ekstraklasa players
I liga players
II liga players
III liga players
Podbeskidzie Bielsko-Biała players
Stal Mielec players
Odra Opole players
Polonia Środa Wielkopolska players
Sportspeople from Opole